Ramon Ernesto Reyes Jr. (born 1966) is an American lawyer who serves as a United States Magistrate Judge for the United States District Court for the Eastern District of New York. He is a nominee to serve as a United States District Judge  of the same court.

Education 

Reyes received a Bachelor of Science from Cornell University in 1988, a Juris Doctor from Brooklyn Law School in 1992 and a Master of Laws from New York University School of Law in 1993.

Career 

In 1991, Reyes was a summer associate at Morrison & Foerster in their Manhattan office. In 1993, he was a legislative attorney for the New York City Council. From 1994 to 1995, he served as a law clerk for Judge David G. Trager of the United States District Court for the Eastern District of New York. From 1995 to 1998, he was a litigation associate at O'Melveny & Myers in New York City. From 1998 to 2006, Reyes served as an assistant United States attorney for the United States Attorney's Office for the Southern District of New York. From 2008 to 2017, he was an adjunct professor of clinical law at Brooklyn Law School.

Federal judicial service 

Since February 13, 2006, he has served as a magistrate judge for the Eastern District of New York. Reyes was recommended to President Joe Biden by Senator Chuck Schumer. On September 2, 2022, President Biden announced his intent to nominate Reyes to serve as a United States district judge of the United States District Court for the Eastern District of New York. On September 6, 2022, his nomination was sent to the Senate. President Biden nominated Reyes to the seat vacated by Judge Kiyo A. Matsumoto who assumed senior status on July 23, 2022. On November 30, 2022, a hearing on his nomination was held before the Senate Judiciary Committee. On January 3, 2023, his nomination was returned to the President under Rule XXXI, Paragraph 6 of the United States Senate. He was renominated on January 23, 2023. On February 9, 2023, his nomination was reported out of committee by an 11–10 vote. His nomination is pending before the United States Senate.

Memberships and organizations 

Reyes is a member of the Board of Trustees of Brooklyn Law School and the Board of Directors of the Federal Bar Association, Eastern District Chapter. He previously served as President of the Federal Magistrate Judges Association in 2019, as a member of the Board of Trustees of the Federal Bar Council from 2006 to 2012, and a member of the American Bar Association's Coalition on Racial and Ethnic Justice from 2013 to 2016.

References

External links 

1966 births
Living people
20th-century American lawyers
21st-century American judges
Assistant United States Attorneys
Brooklyn Law School alumni
Brooklyn Law School faculty
Cornell University alumni
Lawyers from Brooklyn
New York (state) lawyers
New York University School of Law alumni
People associated with Morrison & Foerster
People associated with O'Melveny & Myers
United States magistrate judges